Ryoji Katsuki (香月 良仁, born January 22, 1984, in Kurume, Fukuoka) is a Japanese former professional baseball pitcher in Japan's Nippon Professional Baseball. He played with the Chiba Lotte Marines in 2010 and from 2012 to 2016.

His elder brother Ryota is also a former professional baseball player.

External links

1984 births
Living people
People from Kurume
Japanese baseball players
Nippon Professional Baseball pitchers
Chiba Lotte Marines players
Baseball people from Fukuoka Prefecture